This is a list of volumes and chapters of the manga series Genshiken, by Kio Shimoku. The series is published in Japan by Kodansha and in English for the North American market by Del Rey Manga. In Japan, the series was serialized from April 2002 to May 2006 in Afternoon magazine, and reprinted in nine collected volumes released between December 2002 and December 2006. The English version, translated by David Ury, was released between April 2005 and November 2007.

Genshiken follows the everyday lives of a college club for otaku, Shiiou University's , or just "Genshiken" for short. The story begins in Spring 2002 with the character Kanji Sasahara's discovery of the club as a freshman, and progresses until his graduation in March 2006. This timeframe is roughly contemporaneous with the comic's original serialization. Story dates are established periodically by background evidence in the manga, such as calendars, as well as through cyclical events such as school fairs, graduations, and the Summer and Winter "Comic Festival" (Comifes), which precisely mirrors the real-life Comic Market. These dates provide a contextual basis not only for the characters' progression through college, but also the particular era which the characters inhabit, whose iteration of otaku culture the Genshiken manga is a commentary upon. In much the same way, the anime adaptation is considerably more vague about when the series takes place, allowing it to reference more recent developments in the subculture that had not yet taken place at the time of the manga's original publication.

The collected volumes generally have six chapters each. Additionally, each volume contains between-chapter interludes with regards to an otaku-specific topic. This can range from the characters discussing the best moments in the Kujibiki Unbalance anime (a show within a show for the series) in volume four, Tanaka's construction of a figure from scratch in volume six, or reviewing character designs for the newer Kujibiki Unbalance adaptation in volume eight. Although these side-bits do not often pertain directly to the plot of the volume, they provide additional commentary on particular elements of fandom as well as the characters themselves, while further establishing a sense of reality for the world the characters inhabit.



List of volumes

References and notes

Genshiken